The Walter Camp Man of the Year is one of seven awards given annually by the Walter Camp Football Foundation. The award is given to the "Man of the Year" in the world of college football.  The criteria for the award are stated to include success, leadership, public service, integrity, and commitment to American heritage and Walter Camp's philosophy.

Yearly honorees
2021 — Drew Pearson, Tulsa
2019 — Curtis Martin, Pitt
2018 — Mike Golic, Notre Dame
2017 — Calvin Johnson, Georgia Tech
2016 — Warrick Dunn, Florida State
2015 — Fred Biletnikoff, Florida State and Joe Andruzzi, Southern Connecticut State University
2014 — Jerome Bettis, Notre Dame
2013 — Matt Millen, Penn State
2012 — Herm Edwards, San Diego State
2011 — Harry Carson, South Carolina State
2010 — Will Shields, Nebraska
2009 — John Elway, Stanford
2008 — Morten Andersen, Michigan State
2007 — Dick Butkus, Illinois
2006 — Mike Utley, Washington State
2005 — Dwight Stephenson, Alabama
2004 — Anthony Muñoz, Southern California
2003 — Ozzie Newsome, Alabama
2002 — Jim Kelly, Miami (Florida)
2001 — Mike Singletary, Baylor
2000 — Howie Long, Villanova
1999 — Gil Brandt, Dallas Cowboys
1998 — Lou Holtz, Kent State University
1997 — Calvin Hill, Yale
1996 — Lynn Swann, Southern California
1995 — Reggie Williams, Dartmouth
1994 — Dick Anderson, Colorado
1993 — Warren Moon, Washington
1992 — Bob Griese, Purdue
1991 — Mel Blount, Southern
1990 — Nick Buoniconti, Notre Dame
1989 — Paul Brown, Miami (Ohio)
1988 — Andy Robustelli, Arnold
1987 — Levi Jackson, Yale
1986 — Willie Davis, Grambling
1985 — Rocky Bleier, Notre Dame
1984 — Don Shula, John Carroll
1983 — Roger Staubach, Navy
1982 — Merlin Olsen, Utah State
1981 — Otto Graham, Northwestern
1980 — Gale Sayers, Kansas
1979 — Jack Kemp, Occidental
1978 — Floyd Little, Syracuse
1977 — Frederick Dunlap, Colgate
1976 — Edward Krause, Notre Dame
1975 — Pete Dawkins, Army
1974 — Jake Gaither, Knoxville College/Florida A&M
1973 — Duffy Daugherty, Syracuse/Michigan State
1972 — Clinton Frank, Yale
1971 — Doc Blanchard, Army
1970 — Harry Kipke, Michigan
1969 — Pete Rozelle, San Francisco
1968 — Ted Blair, Yale
1967 — Hamilton Fish, Harvard

See also
 Walter Camp Distinguished American Award
 Walter Camp Alumni of the Year
 Amos Alonzo Stagg Award
 National Football Foundation Distinguished American Award
 National Football Foundation Gold Medal Winners
 Theodore Roosevelt Award (NCAA)
 Walter Payton Man of the Year Award
 "Whizzer" White NFL Man of the Year Award

References

External links
Walter Camp Football Foundation Man of the Year

College football lifetime achievement awards
Awards established in 1967
Lists of sportsmen